Winnertzia solidaginis is a species of non-brachycera in the family Cecidomyiidae. It is found in Europe.

References

Further reading

 
 

Cecidomyiidae
Articles created by Qbugbot
Insects described in 1907